Avery Lawrence Schreiber (April 9, 1935 – January 7, 2002) was an American actor and comedian. He was a veteran of stage, television, and movies who came to prominence in the 1960s in a comedy duo with Jack Burns. He acted in an array of roles mostly on television sitcoms and a series of popular advertisements for Doritos tortilla chips.

Life and career
Schreiber was born in Chicago, Illinois, the son of Minnie (née Shear) and George Schreiber. He started his career in Chicago at the Goodman Theatre. He joined The Second City and later teamed with Jack Burns to form the comedy team of Burns and Schreiber. They recorded several comedy albums and appeared on numerous television shows. Schreiber was of the Jewish faith.

Schreiber is remembered for his many Doritos commercials during the 1970s and 1980s, as well as his appearances on several television series. He was known for his trademark bushy handlebar moustache, curly hair, and comedic reactions.

In 1965, Schreiber played the role of Captain Manzini on My Mother the Car. In the summer of 1973, he co-hosted the ABC comedy The Burns and Schreiber Comedy Hour. He was a regular guest star on the situation comedy Chico and the Man, and was also a frequent guest panelist on the game show Match Game, and a guest in a first-season episode of The Muppet Show (written by former partner Jack Burns, whom he mentioned during a stand-up routine in the episode). In addition, he participated in the 1980 Tournament of Celebrities on the Jim Perry-hosted version of Card Sharks.

His movie appearances include The Monitors (the first film production of Chicago's Second City comedy troupe, 1969), Don't Drink the Water (1969), Deadhead Miles (1972), Swashbuckler (1976), The Last Remake of Beau Geste (1977), The Concorde ... Airport '79, Silent Scream (1979), Scavenger Hunt (1979), Caveman (1981), Jimmy the Kid (1983) and Robin Hood: Men in Tights (1993).

Avery continued to work in film, television and theater, as well as teaching improvisational theater technique up until the time of his death. He taught master classes at The Second City in Chicago and Los Angeles.

He and his wife Rochelle had two children.

Death 
In 1994, Schreiber suffered a heart attack resulting from complications of diabetes. Although he survived triple coronary artery bypass surgery, he never fully recovered. He died of another heart attack on January 7, 2002, at Cedars-Sinai Medical Center.

Legacy
In 2003, the Avery Schreiber Theatre was founded in North Hollywood, California. In 2013, the Avery Schreiber Theatre changed its name to The Avery Schreiber Playhouse with the approval of Rochelle Isaacs Schreiber (née Shelley), Avery's widow. It is located at 4934 Lankershim Boulevard in the NoHo Arts District.

Filmography

Features

Television

References

External links

 

1935 births
2002 deaths
American male comedians
American male film actors
American male stage actors
American male television actors
Comedians from Illinois
Male actors from Chicago
20th-century American comedians
20th-century American male actors
Jewish American actors